Marxism and Morality is a 1985 book about Marxist ethics by the political and social theorist Steven Lukes. The book was praised by commentators, who credited Lukes with showing the paradoxes inherent within Marxist approaches to morality. It has been called a classic introduction.

Reception
Marxism and Morality has been described as a classic introduction to its subject by the political theorist Terrell Carver. The book received positive reviews from Michael Perelman in the Southern Economic Journal and Alan Swingewood in the British Journal of Sociology. The book was also reviewed by the philosopher Arthur Danto in The Times Literary Supplement, Michael Donnelly in the American Journal of Sociology, and May Ellen Batiuk in Humanity & Society, and discussed by David Bankhurst in Praxis International.

Perelman described the book as "a work of disarming simplicity that brings together much of the far reaching literature on the subject of Marxism and morality." He credited Lukes with "bringing both scholarship and intelligence to his subject matter", finding Lukes's discussion of the wage/labor relationship especially successful. He disagreed with Lukes that the philosopher Karl Marx underestimated the importance of values such as freedom of the press, writing that "the effective use of such freedom rarely extended beyond the privileged strata of society", and criticized Lukes for neglecting Marx's insight that capitalists and workers both behave through "character masks." He concluded that, "Despite its shortcomings, Lukes offers us a useful, though idiosyncratic vision of Marx's theory of morality."

Swingewood described the book as "a notable contribution to current debates on the problems of socialist ethics and moral theory". He credited Lukes with offering "a concise and cogently argued analysis of the many paradoxes within Marxism on ethics and moral theory." He called Lukes's chapter on the "means-ends debate" "brilliant", writing that Lukes showed how "the possibility of alternative means (and thus the need to argue for them outside the framework of historical necessity) was largely ignored." He concluded that, "Lukes's book is an important contribution to the contemporary debate on the renewal of democratic socialism."

Bankhurst praised Lukes for his "honesty and responsibility" in confronting the issue of whether Marxism suffers from a "deep-rooted theoretical incoherence" that accounts for its "terrible record" in political life, commenting that, "In the realm of morality" Marx's thought "does seem to abound in paradoxes and peculiarities." He credited Lukes with correctly characterizing Marx's basic outlook on morality as an analysis of it "as an expression of class struggle" combined with "the dismissal of the prevailing moral orthodoxy as the embodiment of the interests of the dominant class."

References

Bibliography
Books

 

Journals

  
  
  
  
  
  

1985 non-fiction books
Books about Marxism
Books by Steven Lukes
Contemporary philosophical literature
English-language books
Ethics books
Oxford University Press books